Majmaah University (MU) is located in Al Majma'ah, Saudi Arabia. It was founded in 2009. The university main campus is located in the south part of Majmaah City. Teaching and research are delivered in 13 academic schools. The university is established to serve a wide area including Majmmah, Zulfi, Remah, Ghat and Hawtat Sudair. The university has around 20 buildings for the administration, colleges, deanships, medical services and units.

College of Dentistry

In consonance with the expansion process of Majmaah University, the College of Dentistry effectively came into being during 2010-2011 academic session-https://www.mu.edu.sa/en/colleges/faculty-dentistry-al-zulfi/sections.  We need to note here that Majmmah University operates multi-campus system in its catchment area to widen accessibility; hence its College of Dentistry is located at  Zulfi. The college offers Bachelor of Dentistry degree to qualified students. Currently the following academic departments are functional at the college:
1.Department of Oral and Maxillofacial Surgery and Diagnostic Sciences
2.Department of Dental Repair
3.Department of Preventive Dental Sciences 
4.Department of Prosthodontics Dental Sciences
5 Department of Basic Medical Sciences 
6 Department of Dental Education

A Dental Teaching Center has also been set up to serve the twin purposes of clinical training and serving the community. An array of regulatory tasks and physical structures that could facilitate teaching and research has been put in place.

References

External links 
Majmaah University Website

 

2009 establishments in Saudi Arabia
Educational institutions established in 2009
Universities and colleges in Saudi Arabia